Conioselinum scopulorum, also commonly known as Rocky Mountain hemlockparsley or hemlock parsley, is a perennial herb found in parts of the Rocky Mountains from southern Montana to Arizona and New Mexico.

References

External links 
USDA Plants Profile

Plants used in traditional Native American medicine
Apioideae